Blatchley may refer to:

People
Emily Blatchley (1842–1874), British Protestant Christian missionary to China with the China Inland Mission
John Polwhele Blatchley (1913–2008), London-born car designer; worked with J Gurney Nutting and Rolls-Royce
Willis Blatchley (1859–1940), American entomologist, malacologist and geologist

Heritage
Blatchley Hall, on the campus of the College of Idaho in Caldwell, Canyon County, Idaho, built in 1910
Blatchley House, historic house located at 370 Blatchley Road near Jordanville, Herkimer County, New York
Willis S. Blatchley House, national historic site located at 232 Lee Street, Dunedin, Pinellas County, Florida 

Education
Blatchley middle school in Sitka School District, Alaska

See also
Batley
Blatch
Blatchleya
Latchley